In graph theory, a cycle decomposition is a decomposition (a partitioning of a graph's edges) into cycles. Every vertex in a graph that has a cycle decomposition must have even degree.

Brian Alspach and Heather Gavlas established necessary and sufficient conditions for the existence of a decomposition of a complete graph of even order minus a 1-factor (a perfect matching) into even cycles and a complete graph of odd order into odd cycles. Their proof relies on  Cayley graphs, in particular, circulant graphs, and many of their decompositions come from the action of a permutation on a fixed subgraph.

References

.

Graph theory